Perpetual Movement is a Canadian short film, directed by Claude Jutra and released in 1949.

An experimental short film shot in slow motion and set to Ottokar Nováček's violin composition Perpetuum mobile, the film depicts a love triangle between two men and a woman. It takes significant risks for its era, including portraying the woman as an autonomous sexual being who freely expresses her own desires and depicting subtle but not fully explicit suggestions of homoerotic desire between the two men.

In Peter Rist's 2001 Guide to the Cinema(s) of Canada, the film is linked to the contemporaneous Refus Global manifesto of opposition to the staid traditionalism of Quebec's arts scene in the era, although Jutra was not himself a signatory on the original document.

The film won the Canadian Film Award for Best Amateur Film in 1950, and led to Norman McLaren extending Jutra a job offer to work for the National Film Board.

References

External links

1949 films
Canadian drama short films
Canadian LGBT-related short films
Canadian Screen Award-winning films
Films directed by Claude Jutra
Canadian black-and-white films
1940s Canadian films